Sybrand Jacobus "SJ" Loftie-Eaton (born 11 October 1996) is a Namibian cricketer. He made his first-class debut on 6 February 2014 in the CSA Provincial Three-Day Competition tournament. In January 2016 he was named in Namibia's squad for the 2016 Under-19 Cricket World Cup.

References

External links
 

1996 births
Living people
Namibian cricketers
Place of birth missing (living people)